María Elena Airport  was an airstrip  northwest of María Elena, a mining town in the Antofagasta Region of Chile.

Google Earth Historical Imagery (12/24/2014) shows a "closed" marker (a large "X") placed in the middle of the runway, and another marker on the access road leading to the runway. The markers are not there in the earlier (3/12/2010) image.

See also

Transport in Chile
List of airports in Chile

References

External links
OpenStreetMap - María Elena Airport

Defunct airports
Airports in Chile
Airports in Antofagasta Region